Walter Heath can refer to:

 Walter Heath (Gloucestershire cricketer) (1860–1937), English cricketer
 Walter Heath (Surrey cricketer) (1897–1965), English cricketer